Hologic, Inc. is a medical technology company primarily focused on women’s health; it sells medical devices for diagnostics, surgery, and medical imaging.

History
In late November 2013, activist investor Carl Icahn disclosed a 12.5% stake in the company.  Subsequently, the company adopted a poison pill to prevent a hostile takeover.  In negotiations with the Company's board of directors, two additional directors backed by Mr. Icahn were added to the board, each managing directors of Icahn holding companies. Icahn considered his investment and intervention into Hologic to have been a success, with his nominees to the board of directors resigning on March 3, 2016 and exiting his position by May 16, 2016.

In 2017, Hologic acquired Westford, Massachusetts-based aesthetic medicine company Cynosure for $1.65 billion.

On November 20, 2019, Hologic announced the divestment of Cynosure to Clayton, Dubilier & Rice for $205 million; this was completed on December 30, 2019. Cynosure had ~825 employees at the time of the divestiture.

In March 2020, Hologic received emergency use authorization from the FDA for a test for severe acute respiratory syndrome coronavirus 2 to help mitigate the COVID-19 pandemic. In May 2020, Hologic received a second emergency use authorization from the FDA for 2019-nCov to increase potential throughput of testing.

In June 2020, Hologic collaborated with Grifols, a global producer of plasma-driven medicines, to increase Spain's testing capacity for COVID-19.

In November 2020, Hologic won a $119 million contract from the U.S. Department of Health and Human Services and the Department of Defense to help expand production facilities in three states, Wisconsin, Maine and California, with the goal to provide 13 million COVID tests per month by January 2022.

In January 2021, the company announced it would acquire Biotheranostics and its breast and metastatic cancer test portfolio for $230 Million and SOMATEX for $64 Million.

In April 2021, the company announced it will acquire Mobidiag, a molecular diagnostics firm with multiplex technology, for $795 Million. The acquisition completed in June 2021.

In March 2022, the Women's Tennis Association and Hologic announced a multi-million, multi-year partnership.

References

External links
Official website

Companies based in Middlesex County, Massachusetts
Marlborough, Massachusetts
American companies established in 1985
Health care companies established in 1985
Health care companies based in Massachusetts
Companies listed on the Nasdaq
Medical technology companies of the United States